Eldred Township may refer to the following townships in the United States:

 Eldred Township, Cass County, North Dakota 
 Eldred Township, Jefferson County, Pennsylvania
 Eldred Township, Lycoming County, Pennsylvania
 Eldred Township, McKean County, Pennsylvania
 Eldred Township, Monroe County, Pennsylvania
 Eldred Township, Schuylkill County, Pennsylvania
 Eldred Township, Warren County, Pennsylvania